A number of notable software packages were developed for, or are maintained by, the Free Software Foundation as part of the GNU Project.

What it means to be a GNU package
Summarising the situation in 2013, Richard Stallman identified nine aspects which generally apply to being a GNU package, but he noted that exceptions and flexibility are possible when there are good reasons:

 The package should say that it is a GNU package.
 It should be distributed via ftp.gnu.org, or another site offering access to everyone.
 The package's homepage should be on the GNU website.
 The developers must pay attention to making their software work well with other GNU packages.
 Documentation should be in Texinfo format, or in a format easily convertible to Texinfo.
 Should use GNU Guile for its extension language, but exceptions are explicitly possible in this regard.
 Should not recommend any non-free program, nor refer the user to any non-free documentation or non-free software.
 Use GNU terminology, including referring to GNU/Linux systems and free software in situations where other observers would write Linux and open source.
 The maintainer should be contactable, at least infrequently, to discuss problems in the software or fixing compatibility issues.

Base system
There is no official "base system" of the GNU operating system.  GNU was designed to be a replacement for Unix operating systems of the 1980s and used the POSIX standards as a guide, but either definition would give a much larger "base system".  The following list is instead a small set of GNU packages which seem closer to being "core" packages than being in any of the further down sections.  Inclusions (such as plotutils) and exclusions (such as the C standard library) are of course debatable.

Notes

Software development
The software listed below is generally useful to software developers and other computer programmers.

GNU toolchain 

 GNU Binutils – contains the GNU assembler (as) and the GNU linker (ld)
 GNU Bison – parser generator intended to replace yacc
 GNU build system (autotools) – contains Autoconf, Automake, Autoheader, and Libtool
 GNU Compiler Collection – optimizing compiler for many programming languages, including C, C++, Fortran, Ada, and Java
 GNU Debugger (gdb) – an advanced debugger
 GNU m4 – macro processor
 GNU make – Make program for GNU

Other libraries and frameworks 
The following libraries and software frameworks are often used in combination with the basic toolchain tools above to build software. (For libraries specifically designed to implement GUI desktops, see Graphical desktop.)

 BFD – object file library
 DotGNU – replacement for Microsoft .NET
 GNU C Library (glibc) – POSIX-compliant C library
 GNU Classpath – libraries for Java
 GNU FriBidi – a library that implements Unicode's Bidirectional Algorithm
 GNU ease.js – A Classical Object-Oriented framework for JavaScript
 GNU gettext – internationalization library
 Gnulib – portability library designed for use with the GNU build system
 GNU libmicrohttpd – embeddable HTTP server
 GNU lightning – just-in-time compilation for generating machine language
 GNU oSIP – Session Initiation Protocol library to implement VoIP applications
 GNU Portable Threads (pth) – software threads for POSIX-compatible operating systems

Other compilers and interpreters
The following packages provide compilers and interpreters for programming languages beyond those included in the GNU Compiler Collection.
 CLISP – ANSI Common Lisp implementation (compiler, debugger, and interpreter)
 Gawk – GNU awk implementation
 GnuCOBOL – COBOL compiler
 GNU Common Lisp – implementation of Common Lisp
 GNU MDK – a development kit for programming in MIX
 GNU Pascal – Pascal compiler
 GNU Smalltalk – ANSI Smalltalk-98 implementation (interpreter and class library)
 MIT/GNU Scheme – interpreter, compiler and library for the Scheme programming language developed at MIT
 SmartEiffel – GNU Eiffel compiler
 Gforth — GNU Forth compiler

Other developer tools
 Data Display Debugger – debugger front-end for several debuggers (ddd)
 GNU arch – distributed revision control system (deprecated in favor of GNU Bazaar)
 GNU AutoGen – active tier-style tool for automated code generation
 GNU Bazaar – distributed revision control system
 GNU cflow – generates C flow graphs
 GNU cppi – indents C preprocessor directives in files to reflect their nesting
 GNU Fontutils – font management utilities
 GNU gperf – perfect hash function generator
 GNU indent – program to indent C and C++ source code
 GNU complexity – measures the complexity of C source code
 GNUnited Nations - program for the translation of html files.

User applications
The software listed below is generally useful to users not specifically engaged in software development.

Graphical desktop
The following packages provide GUI desktop environments, window managers, and associated graphics libraries.
 GTK+ – GIMP Toolkit, containing the GTK+, GDK, and GLib set of libraries (used by the GIMP and GNOME)
 GNUstep – implementation of the  Cocoa/OpenStep libraries and development tools for graphical applications
 Window Maker – window manager for the GNUstep environment

General system administration
 GNU Accounting Utils – set of utilities providing statistics on users and processes (last, ac, accton, lastcomm, sa, dump-utmp, dump-acct)
 GNU ddrescue – data recovery tool
 GNU Emacs – implementation of Emacs editor
 GNU fcrypt – on-the-fly encryption
 GNU Guix – package manager
 GNU libextractor – metadata extraction library and tool
 GNU Midnight Commander – text-based Orthodox file manager & FTP client
 Mtools − collection of tools to edit MS-DOS floppy disks
 GNU nano – text editor
 GNU parallel – shell tool for executing jobs in parallel
 GNU Parted – hard drive partitioning program
 GNU Privacy Guard – PGP encryption replacement
 GNU Privacy Assistant, a graphical frontend to GNU Privacy Guard
 GNU Stow – managing the installation of software packages
 pexec – shell tool for executing jobs in parallel

Database
 GnowSys – kernel for semantic computing (a distributed agent oriented knowledge base.)
 GNU dbm (GDBM)
 GNU Ferret – Free Entity Relationship and Reverse Engineering Tool, an SQL database designer

Scientific software
 GNU Archimedes – TCAD software for semiconductor device simulations
 GNU Astronomy Utilities (Gnuastro) – Programs and libraries for astronomical data manipulation and analysis
 GNU Circuit Analysis Package (Gnucap) – GNU Circuit Analysis Package
 GNU datamash – programming language and command line utility for statistical computing
 GNU Electric – EDA software used to draw schematics and to do integrated circuit layout
 GNU MCSim – simulation and statistical inference tool for algebraic or differential equation systems
 GNU Multi-Precision Library (GMP) – arbitrary precision numerical calculation programming library
 GNU Octave – program for numerical computations, similar to MATLAB
 GNU Scientific Library (GSL) – Numeric analysis library.
 GNU Units – unit conversion
 R – programming language and software environment for statistical computing and graphics
 PSPP – statistical program, similar to SPSS
 XaoS – fractal zoomer

Internet

Dld — performs dynamic link editing 
Jami (formerly GNU Ring) – a free softphone and videocall software, a drop-in replacement for Skype
 GNU Alexandria – uses GNU Bayonne to provide access to electronic content and services for the blind over the public telephone network
 GNU Anubis – outgoing mail processor that sits between the Mail User Agent and the Mail Transport Agent
 GNU FM – federated music community platform, most commonly associated with Libre.fm
 GNU Mailman – electronic mailing list management
 GNU MediaGoblin – decentralized media sharing
 GNU Artanis – Web Application Framework
 GNU Social – distributed social network that is the continuation of the StatusNet codebase
 Gnu Sovix – PHP-based website revision system
 GNU wget – advanced file retrieval from networks and the Internet
 GNUnet – decentralized, peer-to-peer communication network designed to be resistant to censorship
 Gnuzilla – version of the Mozilla Application Suite containing free software only (includes GNU IceCat web-browser)
 lsh – implementation of the Secure Shell (SSH) protocol version 2
 GNU LibreJS – a browser add-on that detects and blocks non-free and non-trivial JavaScript
 GNU Taler – an anonymous electronic payment system
 GNU Pipo BBS, a BBS under the GNU General Public License

Office
 GNU Aspell –  spell-checker designed to eventually replace Ispell
 GNU gcal – calculating and printing calendars
 GNU Miscfiles – several data files including standard airport, country, and language codes
 GNU Typist – multi-lingual typing tutor
 Gnumeric – spreadsheet program (Microsoft Excel compatible)
 Ocrad – optical character recognition

Multimedia
 3DLDF – graphics package for producing three-dimensional technical drawings (especially for inclusion in TeX documents)
 Dia – vector graphics program for creating diagrams
 GIMP – GNU Image Manipulation Program, a bitmap image editor (similar to Photoshop)
 Gnash – player and browser plugin for the Adobe Flash file format
 GNU LibreDWG – library for reading and writing .dwg files (used in CAD applications)
 GNU LilyPond – music typesetting application
 Gnu Maverik – Virtual Reality microkernel
 Gnu Panorama – 3D framework, ray tracing

Games
 GNU Backgammon – backgammon game
 GNUbik – implementation of the Rubik's Cube puzzle
 GNU Chess – chess engine for use with glChess, Xboard or similar
 GNU Go – implementation of the board game Go
 GNU Jump – based on Xjump; also known as SDL Jump
 GNU Kart – racing game
 GNU Robots – game for computer programmers
 GNU FreeDink - implementation of Dink Smallwood adventure/role-playing game
 Liquid War – war game

Business applications
 GNU Health – free health and hospital information system
 GNUmed – medical practice management software
 GnuCash – financial accounting application
 GNU remotecontrol – a web application for managing building automation devices
 GNU Foliot – time keeping application for small organizations
 GNU.FREE, a free voting system, suspended in 2002
 GNU Taler - planned decentralized online payment system designed to be taxable and accessible to mainstream currencies.
 GNUe (GNU Enterprise), an enterprise planning software.

Fonts
 GNU FreeFont – a family of scalable outline fonts
 GNU Unifont

See also

 Free software movement
 High Priority Free Software Projects

References

External links
 FSF Free Software Directory – All GNU Packages

GNU packages